Squamura kinabalua is a moth in the family Cossidae. It is found on Borneo. The habitat consists of upper montane forests.

References

Natural History Museum Lepidoptera generic names catalog

Metarbelinae
Moths described in 1976